Marche Funèbre is the second EP by Soap&Skin. It was released on October 26, 2009.

Track listing
"Thanatos" - 2:35
"Marche Funèbre (Yrazor)" - 9:18
"Marche Funèbre (Dj Koze Marxa Mix)" - 5:12

External links
 Soap&Skin official website
 Marche Funèbre at discogs.com

Soap&Skin albums
2009 EPs